Birger Solberg Meling (born 17 December 1994) is a Norwegian professional footballer who plays as a left-back for  club Rennes.

Club career

Early career 
After playing youth football for Viking and Middlesbrough, Meling joined Stabæk before the 2014 season. He made his senior league debut in September 2014 in a 3–0 defeat against Aalesund. In February 2017, he signed for Rosenborg.

Nîmes 
In July 2020, Meling joined Nîmes on a three-year contract. The transfer fee paid to Rosenborg was less than €1 million. On his Ligue 1 debut on the season's first matchday, he contributed an assist and a goal in Nîmes's 4–0 win against Brest.

Career statistics

Club

International

Honours
Rosenborg
 Norwegian League: 2017, 2018
 Norwegian Football Cup:  2018

References

1994 births
Living people
Sportspeople from Stavanger
Association football defenders
Norwegian footballers
Norwegian expatriate footballers
Norway under-21 international footballers
Norway international footballers
Stabæk Fotball players
Rosenborg BK players
Nîmes Olympique players
Stade Rennais F.C. players
Eliteserien players
Ligue 1 players
Expatriate footballers in France